The 37th Regiment of Bengal Native Infantry was a regiment of the East India Company’s Bengal Army, which had only become a separate regiment in 1824, and was later to become one of the regiments which took part in the Indian Rebellion of 1857 at Benares in 1857.

References

Honourable East India Company regiments
History of Varanasi
Indian Rebellion of 1857
Military history of the British East India Company
Bengal Presidency
Bengal Native Infantry
1824 establishments in the British Empire